The Oberbergtal is the largest tributary valley of the Stubaital, branching north above Milders and curving south-west to the road-head at OberIss. 2 hours up the path is the Franz Senn Hut.

Location 
The Oberbergtal joins the main valley from the left at Milders (1,026 m, Neustift im Stubaital). The head of the valley is formed by the glaciated Alpeiner Berge (Schrankogel 3,497 m, Ruderhofspitze 3,474 m, Östliche 3,416 m and Westliche Seespitze 3,355 m), which surround the Alpeiner Ferner and several side glaciers. Heading down he valley the line of mountains on the right descends gradually to the Brennerspitze (2,877 m) and on the left runs over the Hohe Villerspitze (3,087 m) to the Hoher Burgstall (2,611 m).

Valleys of Tyrol (state)
Valleys of the Alps
Innsbruck-Land District